Pioneer Career and Technology Center is a public vocational school in Shelby, Ohio.  It is Ohio's 5th largest vocational school. It serves the area around the counties of Richland and Crawford. Its classes are open to juniors and seniors in local high schools.

High school 
Students from partner schools around the area are allowed to come to PCTC starting their Junior year of high school as long as they reach the curriculum requirements to enter after completion of their Sophomore year in which they will review your past grades of your past two years of high schooling. Once entered, students have the choice of choosing a lab which they will be in for around two and a half hours daily. These labs have certain requirements to gain grades depending upon the nature of the lab and also feature certain attire based upon the job skills which students will be learning.

Such labs consist of a wide variety of job choices which range from Agricultural related areas to fields related to Transportation. The range of lab choices will help students after graduating have the ability to enter the workforce immediately with the acquired skills which they have learned. Since skills are learned, lab instructors require students to treat the class as a working environment as students will depending upon their lab do work for clients and customers.

Partner schools 
Enrollment is open to students from any of PCTC's fourteen partner schools.

Buckeye Central High School
Bucyrus High School
Colonel Crawford High School
Crestline High School
Crestview High School
Galion High School
Lexington High School
Lucas High School
Northmor High School
Ontario High School 
Plymouth High School
Shelby High School
Willard High School
Wynford High School

References

Vocational schools in Ohio
High schools in Richland County, Ohio
Education in Ohio
Public high schools in Ohio